The A8 motorway, an Autobahn in central Switzerland, is a divided highway connecting the Bernese Oberland and the Innerschweiz. It is part of the National Road N8. For the Canton of Obwalden, it is the lifeline that has allowed the settling of industrial firms in this historically predominantly agricultural region. Via the A8, speedy connections to the major economic centers in the Mittelland and the north–south transit axis A2 are now possible. For tourists, A8 opens up in the opposite direction: the large ski resorts in the Bernese Oberland and the tourism regions around the Brünig Pass and Interlaken.

Route 
The A8 provides a scenic route to the Lake Thun to Interlaken, passing the former Mystery Park and continues along the southern shore of Lake Brienz for Brienz BE, where it winds its way on up to the Brünig pass.

 the north side of the pass extends down to Lungern, where a  bypass tunnel is currently under construction (scheduled completion 2012). It continues parallel to the Lake Lungern shoreline until the hamlet of Kaiserstuhl OW and then with a series of steep switchbacks drops down to Giswil. A  road tunnel, opened in Oct 2004, bypasses the village, considerably reducing the through-traffic and sparing travellers the long wait at grade level crossing of the Bruenigbahn in the village center. Next, just a few hundred meters after the Giswil tunnel comes the Zollhouse tunnel, a 417-m Cut-and-cover long stretch that straightens out a narrow section of road next to the Sarnen Lake (due to open in mid-2010). A few hundred meters further comes the portal to the next bypass tunnel, that of Sachseln, which, with its just over  length, is one of the longer single bore road tunnels in Switzerland. After the tunnel is Sarnen, where the road is expanded to a 4 lane divided highway. Built over a former military airstrip (along with bridge), it serves as a straight highway to Alpnach, while ahead Mount Pilatus rises. Finally, the road follows the edge of the Alpnachersee lake along the Lopper Tunnel portal. Via an elaborate series of sub-tunnels inside the mountain, this connects in both north and south directions with the A2 enabling travel north to Luzern and Germany beyond as well as south towards the Gotthard and Italy. The ability to turn off the A2 onto the A8 in the northbound direction was only added with the construction of the new Kirchenwald tunnel and a  single lane connecting tunnel (which turns off the A2 inside the mountain, loops over the top of the main A2 tunnel before emerging parallel to the A8 Lopper portal.

Transportation  
The A8 is the only east–west connection in the region that is open year-round, and hence it has heavy traffic. Except in the Interlaken area and Sarnen, where it is four lanes, it is mostly an Autostrasse road (wider, with hard shoulders and designed for 100 km/h speeds); however the Brünig Pass section is just a normal pass road (80km/h speed limit although the practical limit is considerably less in sections). Development projects are underway in Lungern (Bypass Tunnel, opening 2012) and between the Sachseln bypass tunnel and the Zollhouse tunnel (opening mid-2010). In planning is another tunnel, which will link the Giswil tunnel up to Kaiserstuhl. A Bruenigpass tunnel has been under consideration for decades but is not currently part of the official long term planning due in part to concerns about increasing the quantity of heavy goods traffic from Bern along the route.

Military use
The A8 motorway (Switzerland) near Alpnach Air Base was built so that it could be used as a takeoff and landing runway and was associated with temporary taxiways with the Aircraft cavern. However, only take-off were made for safety  reasons, the landings were made on the normal runway with   F-5 "Tiger".  .

Major engineering works 
The following are major construction projects underway along A8:
 Umfahrungstunnel Zollhouse, a bypass tunnel
 Umfahrungstunnel Lungern, a bypass tunnel

The following are planned or under consideration:
 Giswil - Kaiserstuhl tunnel
 Bruenigpass tunnel (not currently an official project)

Junction list

Notes

References 

 "Die Schweitzer Autobahnen", Autobahnen.ch, 2009, web: Autobahnen.ch (with sub-webpage for A8).
 More sources in "Motorways of Switzerland".

External links 
 A8 Project website of the Canton of Obwalden in German
 Fertigstellungsabschnitte A8 Obwalden/Nidwalden Website of the Bundesamtes für Strassen (ASTRA)
 Photos: A8 on Autobahnen.ch

A08